The Alpes Maritimae (English: 'Maritime Alps') were a small province of the Roman Empire founded in 63 AD by Nero. It was one of the three provinces straddling the Alps between modern France and Italy, along with the Alpes Graiae et Poeninae and Alpes Cottiae. The Alpes Maritimae included parts of the present-day French departments of Alpes-Maritimes (in which the name survives), Alpes-de-Haute-Provence and Hautes-Alpes.

The capital of the province was Cemenelum (modern Cimiez, a neighbourhood of Nice), until it was replaced by Eburodunum (modern Embrun) during the reign of Diocletian (284–305).

History 
 
Following the subjugation of the local Ligurian tribes in the summer of 14 BC, the region was ruled by a praefectus civitatium, then was given Latin Rights in 63 AD and placed under the administration of a procurator. Cemenelum (modern Cimiez), the chief town of the Vediantii, became the capital of the new province.

Under Diocletian (284–305), the province was extended via the incorporation of parts of Gallia Narbonensis and Alpes Cottiae, and was allocated to the praefectura Galliarum (Diocese of Vienne). The capital was transferred to Eburodunum (modern Embrun), which had been part of the Alpes Cottiae until that time.

Settlements 
Major settlements within the province included:
 Cemenelum (Cimiez)
 Nicaea (Nice)
 Antipolis (Antibes)
 Portus Herculis Monoeci (Monaco)
 Salinae (Castellane)
 Sanitium (Senez)
 Vintium (Vence)

After 297 the province was expanded to include:
 Ebrodunum (Embrun)
 Brigantio (Briançon)
 Brigomagus (Briançonnet)
 Civitas Rigomagensium / Rigomagus (Chorges)

References

Bibliography 

 

Provinces of the Roman Empire
Tres Alpes
States and territories established in the 1st century BC
60s establishments in the Roman Empire
476 disestablishments
470s disestablishments in the Roman Empire